Pedro Anselmo Bazalar is a Peruvian football club, playing in the city of Huacho, Peru.

History
In the 2011 Torneo Intermedio, the club was eliminated by Universidad César Vallejo in the round of 32.

Honours

Regional
Liga Distrital de Huacho:
Winners (1): 2011
Runner-up (3): 2009, 2010, 2012

See also
List of football clubs in Peru
Peruvian football league system

External links
Facebook Web

Football clubs in Peru
Association football clubs established in 2003